Eugenio Colorni (22 April 1909 – 30 May 1944) was an Italian philosopher and anti-fascist activist.

Life
Born in Milan, Colorni taught philosophy at the University of Trieste, and was active in the anti-fascist Giustizia e Libertà movement. He married Ursula Hirschmann, and was an important influence on her brother Albert O. Hirschman, who dedicated his book Exit, Voice, and Loyalty to Colorni's memory. Colorni was one of the promoters of the Ventotene Manifesto and an early instigator of the European Federalist Movement. In the mid 1930s, he was closely associated with Lelio Basso and others. In October 1938 he and Dino Philipson were arrested for their anti-fascist political activity and their Jewish background. He escaped but was killed in Rome by a Nazi ambush in 1944, shortly before the Allies arrived. He had three daughters: Silvia, Renata, and Eva. His youngest daughter Eva married Indian economist Amartya Sen in 1978 and produced two children prior to her death seven years later.

Works
 L'estetica di Benedetto Croce: studio critico, 1932
 (ed.) Leibniz, La Monadologia, 1935
 Leibniz e il misticismo, 1938
 'Filosofia e scienza', Analysis, 1947
 'Apologo', Sigma, 1947
 'I'dialoghi di Commodo', Sigma, 1949
 'Critica filosofia e fisica teoria', Sigma, 1948
 Scritt, Florence: La Nuova Italia, 1975

References

Sources 
 Elvira Gencarelli, Profilo politico di Eugenio Colorni, in «Mondo Operaio», n. 7, luglio 1974, pp. 49–54
 Elvira Gencarelli, Eugenio Colorni, article in Il Movimento Operaio Italiano. Dizionario Biografico, Editori Riuniti, Roma, 1976, vol. II, pp. 74–81
 Leo Solari, Eugenio Colorni. Ieri e sempre, Marsilio, Venezia, 1980
 Eugenio Garin, Colorni, Eugenio, in «Dizionario Biografico degli Italiani», XXVII, Istituto dell'Enciclopedia italiana, Roma, 1982
 Norberto Bobbio, Maestri e compagni, Passigli Editori, Firenze, 1984
 Nunzio Dell'Erba, L'itinerario politico di Eugenio Colorni, in Id., Il socialismo riformista tra politica e cultura, Franco Angeli, Milano 1990, pp. 135–150
 Massimo Orlandi, Il socialismo federalista di Eugenio Colorni, unpublished thesis, Università degli studi di Firenze, Anno Accademico 1991-1992
 Gaetano Arfé, Eugenio Colorni, l'antifascista, l'europeista, in AA. VV., Matteotti, Buozzi, Colorni. Perché vissero, perché vivono, Franco Angeli, Milano, 1996, pp. 58–77
 Sandro Gerbi, Tempi di malafede. Una storia italiana tra fascismo e dopoguerra. Guido Piovene ed Eugenio Colorni, Einaudi, Torino 1999 e Hoepli, Milano, 2012.
 Geri Cerchiai, L'itinerario filosofico di Eugenio Colorni, in «Rivista di Storia della Filosofia», n. 3, 2002
 Stefano Miccolis, Eugenio Colorni ventenne e Croce, in «Belfagor», 4, LXV, 31 luglio 2010, pp. 415–434
 Geri Cerchiai, Alcune riflessioni su Eugenio Colorni, in «Rivista di Storia della Filosofia», LXVII 2012, pp. 351–360.
 Michele Strazza, Melfi terra di confino. Il confino a Melfi durante il fascismo, Melfi, Tarsia, 2002.
 Maurizio Degl'Innocenti (a cura di), Eugenio Colorni dall'antifascismo all'europeismo socialista e federalista, Lacaita, 2010, .

1909 births
1944 deaths
Writers from Milan
Italian Jews who died in the Holocaust
Members of Giustizia e Libertà
20th-century Italian philosophers
Academic staff of the University of Trieste
20th-century Italian writers
Italian prisoners and detainees